Tipula schizomera is a species of large crane fly in the family Tipulidae. It is found in the southwestern United States and Mexico.

References

Tipulidae
Articles created by Qbugbot
Insects described in 1940